Zhabu Hui Ethnic Township is a rural ethnic township in Taojiang County, Hunan Province, People's Republic of China.

Administrative division
The township is divided into 9 villages and 1 community, the following areas: Zhabu Community, Chemenduan Village, Huayuantai Village, Jungongzui Village, Dashuitian Village, Jiangjiaba Village, Nanjingwan Village, Yanxi Village, Taogongmiao Village, and Zhujilun Village (鲊埠社区、车门塅村、花园台村、军功嘴村、大水田村、江家坝村、南京湾村、颜溪村、陶公庙村、筑基仑村).

References

External links

Divisions of Taojiang County
Ethnic townships of the People's Republic of China